Parakysis notialis is a species of catfish of the family Akysidae. It was described in 2003. A detailed discussion of this species's relationship with the other five members of its genus can be found at Parakysis.

Akysidae
Freshwater fish of Indonesia
Taxa named by Maurice Kottelat
Fish described in 2003